Kaseh Gar Mahalleh (also Romanized as Kāseh Gar Maḩalleh) is a village in Goli Jan Rural District, in the Central District of Tonekabon County, Mazandaran Province, Iran. At the 2006 census, its population was 314, in 80 families.

References 

Populated places in Tonekabon County